Stephen James Evans (January 1, 1927 – January 6, 2012) was an American politician and business owner.

Evans was born in Little Falls, Minnesota. He lived in Detroit Lakes, Minnesota with his wife and family and graduated from the Detroit Lakes High School. He served in the United States Air Force during World War II and was involved in the retail grocery business. Evans went to University of North Dakota. Evans served in the Minnesota House of Representatives from 1977 to 1984 and was a Republican.

References

1927 births
2012 deaths
People from Detroit Lakes, Minnesota
People from Little Falls, Minnesota
Military personnel from Minnesota
University of North Dakota alumni
Businesspeople from Minnesota
Republican Party members of the Minnesota House of Representatives